Zahran Alloush (1971 – 25 December 2015) was a Syrian Islamist leader active in the Syrian Civil War. He was the commander of Jaysh al-Islam (or Army of Islam), a major component of the Islamic Front, of which he was the military chief, and was described as one of the most powerful persons in rebel-held Syria. He was killed in a Russian/Syrian airstrike on 25 December 2015 and Essam al-Buwaydhani was named his successor as head of Jaysh al-Islam.

Early life
Zahran Alloush was born in Douma, Rif Dimashq, in 1971, and was married to three women. His father was Abdullah Alloush, a scholar and the previous director of Al Assad center for Quran studies in Damascus. He joined the faculty of law at Damascus University, and completed a master's degree in Shariah at the Islamic University of Madinah. The Syrian Intelligence Palestine Branch arrested him in 2009 on charges of weapons possession. He was released from Sednaya Prison in 2011 as part of a general amnesty three months into the Syrian Uprising.

Syrian Revolution
Following his release, he established a rebel group called the Battalion of Islam to fight the Assad Government. The group expanded and renamed itself the Brigade of Islam, and in 2013 it merged with other rebel factions to form Jaysh al-Islam, still under Alloush's leadership. This became the most powerful rebel group operating in the Damascus area.

According to Joshua Landis,  Alloush called for cleansing Damascus of all Alawites and Shiites, later telling Western journalists that these and similar statements had been caused by the pressure and "psychological stress" he was under from living through the Syrian Government's siege of Ghouta.

A number of Syrian opposition figures have accused Alloush of being responsible for the kidnapping of Syrian activist Razan Zeitouneh and her companions in Douma on 9 December 2013. Alloush denied the allegations.

In April 2015, Zahran Alloush suddenly appeared in the Turkish city of Istanbul. A spokesperson from the Army of Islam declared that Alloush would meet rebel groups' leaders there in order to discuss how to lift the siege in Ghouta. This led to public criticism, with many in the media wondering how he could travel to Turkey and come back while Ghouta was under siege.

Alloush has denounced democracy and called for an Islamic state to succeed Assad; however, in a May 2015 interview with McClatchy journalists, Alloush used moderate rhetoric, claiming that Syrians should decide what sort of state they wanted to live under and that Alawites were "part of the Syrian people" and only those with blood on their hands should be held accountable. His spokesman went on to say that the sectarian and Islamist rhetoric Alloush had previously made was only intended for internal consumption and to rally his fighters. In an interview with The Daily Beast in the same period, his spokesman disassociated Zahran from al-Nusra, denied that he wanted to impose Sharia law, and called for a technocratic government.

He was reported killed, along with other senior members of his faction in the village of Utaya, east of Damascus, on 25 December 2015, in an airstrike on a meeting with rival rebel commanders from Ahrar al-Sham. Lebanese pro-government media said that 13 pro-government airstrikes had targeted Damascus that day. Although the Syrian army claimed the strike, local reports said it was by Russian warplanes. A senior member of Ahrar al-Sham group, which also lost commanders in the airstrike, said "The martyrdom of Sheikh Zahran Allouch should be a turning point in the history of the revolution and rebel groups should realize they are facing a war of extermination by (Russian President Vladimir) Putin's regime." Other insurgent groups, including Jabhat al-Nusra, lamented his loss. His targeting was linked by Western media to his participation in forthcoming peace talks between the government and opposition. The New York Times commented that his death was "a significant blow to the armed opposition, bolstering President Bashar al-Assad".

References

Further reading
 

1971 births
2015 deaths
People from Rif Dimashq Governorate
Syrian Sunni Muslim scholars of Islam
Syrian Salafis
Critics of Shia Islam
Islamic University of Madinah alumni
Syrian prisoners and detainees
Prisoners and detainees of Syria
Deaths by airstrike during the Syrian civil war
Damascus University alumni
2015 murders in Syria